The Divisional C Femenina is the third division of women's football in Uruguay, and is organized by the Uruguayan Football Association since 2022, from a FIFA request.

Champions 
The Divisional C organized by the Uruguayan Football Association began to dispute in 2022.

Titles by club

See also 
 Uruguay women's national football team
 Copa Libertadores de Fútbol Femenino
 Uruguayan football league system

References

External links 
 Fútbol Femenino en la Página oficial de la AUF
 Campeonato Uruguayo Femenino en RSSSF 
 Campeonato Femenino C

Women
Uruguay
Sports leagues established in 2022
2022 establishments in Uruguay
Women's football in Uruguay
Women's sports leagues in Uruguay